Niewierowo  (German Nipnow) is a village in the administrative district of Gmina Słupsk, within Słupsk County, Pomeranian Voivodeship, in northern Poland. 

The village has a population of 68.

References

Niewierowo